Valerie King is an American and Canadian computer scientist who works as a professor at the University of Victoria. Her research concerns the design and analysis of algorithms; her work has included results on maximum flow and dynamic graph algorithms, and played a role in the expected linear time MST algorithm of Karger et al.

King graduated from Princeton University in 1977. She earned a Juris Doctor degree from the University of California, Berkeley School of Law in 1983, and became a member of the State Bar of California, but returned to Berkeley and earned a Ph.D. in computer science in 1988 under the supervision of Richard Karp with a dissertation concerning the Aanderaa–Karp–Rosenberg conjecture.

She became a Fellow of the Association for Computing Machinery in 2014.

References

External links
Home page
Google scholar profile

Year of birth missing (living people)
Living people
American computer scientists
Canadian computer scientists
Canadian women computer scientists
Theoretical computer scientists
Princeton University alumni
UC Berkeley School of Law alumni
Academic staff of the University of Victoria
Fellows of the Association for Computing Machinery